Christian Marquise Wood (born September 27, 1995) is an American professional basketball player for the Dallas Mavericks of the National Basketball Association (NBA). He played college basketball for the UNLV Runnin' Rebels. He has also played in the NBA for the Philadelphia 76ers, Charlotte Hornets, Milwaukee Bucks, New Orleans Pelicans, Detroit Pistons and the Houston Rockets.

High school career
Wood originally attended Los Alamitos High School for his first year of high school. He moved and transferred to Knight High School in Palmdale, California for one year before transferring to Findlay Prep in Henderson, Nevada prior to his senior year. In Findlay, he helped the Pilots win 54 consecutive games and an ESPN National High School Invitational championship in 2012. Wood was ranked as the No. 36 overall player in the class of 2013 (no. 8 at his position) by Rivals, Scout listed him at No. 10 at his position and ESPN listed him as the No. 71 prospect overall.

College career
Wood played at UNLV from 2013 to 2015. As a freshman, he played in 30 games with two starts and averaged 4.5 points and 3.2 rebounds per game. As a sophomore, he played in 33 games and averaged 15.7 points, 10 rebounds and 2.7 blocks per game, earning first team All-Mountain West honors. After the season, Wood declared for the 2015 NBA draft.

Professional career

Philadelphia 76ers (2015–2016)

Wood was originally projected to be drafted late in the first round before his stock dropped, which led to more consistent second round projections. Wood ultimately went undrafted in the 2015 NBA draft, and subsequently joined the Houston Rockets for the 2015 NBA Summer League. On September 27, 2015, he signed with the Philadelphia 76ers. On October 28, he made his debut for the 76ers, recording two rebounds in five minutes off the bench in a loss to the Boston Celtics. During his rookie season, he had multiple assignments with the Delaware 87ers of the NBA Development League. On January 4, 2016, he was waived by the 76ers.

Delaware 87ers (2016) 
On January 6, 2016, Wood was acquired by the Delaware 87ers. On March 4, he returned to the 76ers, signing a 10-day contract with the team. However, his stint lasted just three days as he was waived by the 76ers on March 7. Two days later, he was reacquired by Delaware.

Return to Philadelphia (2016) 
Wood was called up again on March 27, signing another 10-day contract with the 76ers. On April 7, he signed with the 76ers for the rest of the season.

In July 2016, Wood re-joined the 76ers for the 2016 NBA Summer League.

Charlotte Hornets (2016–2017)
On July 14, 2016, Wood signed with the Charlotte Hornets. On November 7, he made his debut for the Hornets in a 122–100 win over the Indiana Pacers, recording two rebounds in three minutes off the bench. During his sophomore season, he had multiple assignments with the Greensboro Swarm of the NBA Development League.

Return to Delaware (2017–2018)
After his second season in the NBA, Wood entered free agency due to his second year being a team option. Wood would later join the Dallas Mavericks and Phoenix Suns for the 2017 NBA Summer League out in Orlando and Las Vegas, respectively. Wood was a member of the Mavericks team that won the Summer League Championship in Orlando that year.

On August 9, 2017, Wood signed with the Fujian Sturgeons of the Chinese Basketball Association. However, Wood never played a game for Fujian as he was waived by the team, which allowed him to return to the Delaware 87ers that same year.

Milwaukee Bucks (2018–2019)

On August 14, 2018, Wood was signed by the Milwaukee Bucks. On March 18, 2019, Wood was waived by the Bucks.

New Orleans Pelicans (2019)
On March 20, 2019, Wood was claimed off waivers by the New Orleans Pelicans.

Given Nikola Mirotić's departure, and Anthony Davis expressing his desire to be traded and subsequent reduction in playing time and occasional rest, Wood had an opportunity to get substantial minutes for the first time in his career. On March 24, he made his debut with 7 points in 8 minutes of playing time. On March 26, he put up 23 points, nine rebounds, six blocks, three steals and an assist in over 32 minutes in the Pelicans' loss to the Hawks. He was waived by the Pelicans on July 15, 2019.

Detroit Pistons (2019–2020)
Wood was claimed off waivers by the Detroit Pistons on July 17, 2019.

On March 14, 2020, Wood was reported to be tested positive for COVID-19 amidst the pandemic and the subsequent suspension of the season. He had 30 points and 11 rebounds against Rudy Gobert, who was the first player to test positive, and the Utah Jazz on March 7.

Houston Rockets (2020–2022)
On November 24, 2020, Wood was signed-and-traded to a three-year, $41-million contract from the Pistons to the Houston Rockets in exchange for Trevor Ariza, the draft rights to Isaiah Stewart, a future second round pick, and cash considerations. On December 26, 2020, Wood made his Rockets debut, putting up 31 points, 13 rebounds, three assists, and one block in a 128–126 overtime loss to the Portland Trail Blazers. During a road trip game win against the Memphis Grizzlies, Wood suffered a right ankle injury and left the arena in the third quarter. Without Wood, the Rockets were vulnerable and lost 17 straight games. 

On January 3, 2022, the Rockets suspended Wood for one game without pay for poor behavior. On March 21, Wood recorded a career-high 39 points on a career-high eight three-pointers made in a 115–97 win over the Washington Wizards. On March 29, he was ruled out for the remainder of the season with a hamstring injury.

Dallas Mavericks (2022–present)
On June 24, 2022, Wood was traded to the Dallas Mavericks in exchange for Boban Marjanović, Trey Burke, Marquese Chriss, Sterling Brown, and the draft rights to Wendell Moore Jr. Wood became the first player in franchise history to score at least 25 points each in his first two games.

On December 25, 2022, in his first Christmas Day game, Wood recorded 30 points, 8 rebounds, 7 assists, 4 steals and 2 blocks in a 124–115 victory over the Los Angeles Lakers.

Career statistics

NBA

Regular season

|-
| style="text-align:left;"|
| style="text-align:left;"|Philadelphia
| 17 || 0 || 8.5 || .415 || .364 || .619 || 2.2 || .2 || .3 || .4 || 1.6
|-
| style="text-align:left;"|
| style="text-align:left;"|Charlotte
| 13 || 0 || 8.2 || .522 || .000 || .733 || 2.2 || .2 || .2 || .5 || 2.7
|-
| style="text-align:left;"|
| style="text-align:left;"|Milwaukee
| 13 || 0 || 4.8 || .480 || .600 || .667 || 1.5 || .2 || .0 || .0 || 2.8
|-
| style="text-align:left;"|
| style="text-align:left;"|New Orleans
| 8 || 2 || 23.6 || .533 || .286 || .756 || 7.9 || .8 || .9 || 1.3 || 16.9
|-
| style="text-align:left;"|
| style="text-align:left;"|Detroit
| 62 || 12 || 21.4 || .567 || .386 || .744 || 6.3 || 1.0 || .5 || .9 || 13.1
|-
| style="text-align:left;"|
| style="text-align:left;"|Houston
| 41 || 41 || 32.3 || .514 || .374 || .631 || 9.6 || 1.7 || .8 || 1.2 || 21.0
|-
| style="text-align:left;"|
| style="text-align:left;"|Houston
| 68 || 67 || 30.8 || .501 || .390 || .623 || 10.1 || 2.3 || .8 || 1.0 || 17.9
|-
| style="text-align:left;"|
| style="text-align:left;"|Dallas
| 42 || 17 || 29.0 || .535 || .385 || .737 || 8.4 || 1.7 || .5 || 1.3 || 18.4
|- class="sortbottom"
| style="text-align:center;" colspan="2"|Career
| 264 || 139 || 24.5 || .522 || .381 || .680 || 7.5 || 1.4 || .6 || .9 || 14.9

References

External links

UNLV Runnin’ Rebels bio
NBA G League profile

1995 births
Living people
American men's basketball players
Basketball players from Long Beach, California
Charlotte Hornets players
Dallas Mavericks players
Delaware 87ers players
Detroit Pistons players
Findlay Prep alumni
Greensboro Swarm players
Houston Rockets players
Milwaukee Bucks players
New Orleans Pelicans players
Philadelphia 76ers players
Power forwards (basketball)
Undrafted National Basketball Association players
UNLV Runnin' Rebels basketball players
Wisconsin Herd players